Weightlifting at the 2014 Summer Youth Olympics was held from 17 to 23 August at the Nanjing International Expo Center in Nanjing, China.

Qualification

Each National Olympic Committee (NOC) can enter a maximum of 4 competitors, 2 per each gender. As hosts, China was given the maximum quota, but only selected 1 athlete per gender and a further 11 boys and 9 girls was to be decided by the Tripartite Commission, but only 9 boys and 6 girls were selected, the remaining places were reallocated. The remaining 86 places shall be decided by team classification results from qualification events, namely the 2013 World Youth Championships and five continental qualification tournaments.

To be eligible to participate at the Youth Olympics athletes must have been born between 1 January 1997 and 31 December 1999. Furthermore, NOCs will only be allowed to enter a single athlete in an event.

Boys

Girls

Schedule

The schedule was released by the Nanjing Youth Olympic Games Organizing Committee.

All times are CST (UTC+8)

Medal summary

Medal table

Boy's events

Girl's events

References

External links
Official Results Book – Weightlifting

 
2014 Summer Youth Olympics events
Youth Summer Olympics
2014
International weightlifting competitions hosted by China